Manso may refer to:

Places 
 Manso, Haute-Corse, France
 Manso, Ghana

People 
 Manso (surname)
 Manso Indians, an indigenous American people

Given name 
 Manso, Prefect of Amalfi, Italian noble
 Manso I of Amalfi (died 1004), Italian noble
 Manso II of Amalfi, Italian noble
 Manso (viceduke), Italian noble

See also 
 Manso River (disambiguation)